Jimmy Neutron vs. Jimmy Negatron is a video game for the Microsoft Windows and Game Boy Advance. In the game, the player plays as Jimmy Neutron as he tries to stop his evil doppelganger, Jimmy Negatron, from his evil deeds. It was published by THQ and Nick Games and developed by AWE Games (PC) and Human Soft (GBA). This is the only Jimmy Neutron video game that is not movie based. The PC version contains a demo for SpongeBob SquarePants: Employee of the Month which was released around the same time.

Gameplay

Similar to the PC version of the previous game, Jimmy Neutron vs. Jimmy Negatron is a third-person 3D video game which has gameplay largely consisting of puzzles and problem-solving, with Jimmy having to solve various puzzles to progress, such as gathering required items or passing obstacles. Besides puzzle solving, there are enemies that the player must avoid or battle with in boss fights to progress through certain locations. Throughout the game, the player primarily plays Jimmy Neutron, the protagonist.

Plot
The beginning of the game takes place in a museum in Retroville.

Jimmy decides to build a time machine to impress Cindy.  He sets the travel time to 50 years in the past.  When Jimmy decides to activate the time machine with him and Goddard inside, they are instead teleported into cages in the lair of Jimmy Negatron.  Jimmy Negatron is an evil version of Neutron from another dimension.  Negatron plans on taking over Retroville and Jimmy must stop him.

Reception

The Game Boy Advance version has a score of 55 out of 100 from Metacritic based on "mixed or average reviews".  It was mostly praised for its graphics, which were considered to be above average at the time of its release.

References

External links

 

2002 video games
2003 video games
Game Boy Advance games
Windows games
Single-player video games
Video games about time travel
The Adventures of Jimmy Neutron: Boy Genius video games
THQ games
Video games developed in Hungary
Video games developed in the United States